Football at the 1994 Asian Games was held in Hiroshima, Japan from 1 to 16 October 1994. The Asian Football Confederation suggested that only under-23 teams should be entered, which meant that all the players had to be born after January 1, 1971. But this was ignored by all participants except Saudi Arabia.

The women's tournament doubled the Asian qualification of 1995 FIFA Women's World Cup in Sweden, where China and Japan qualified.

Schedule

Medalists

Medal table

Draw
The original draw for men's tournament was announced on 1 June 1994 as follows:

Group A
 
 
 
 
 

Group B
 
 
 
 
 

Group C
 
 
 
 

Group D
 
 
 
 

Group E
 
 
 
 

On 16 September a revised draw was announced, following some withdrawals. Two more entrants (Malaysia and Palestine) were included.

Group A
 
 
 
 
 

Group B
 
 
 
 
 

Group C
 
 
 
 
 

Group D
 
 
 
 

However, Palestine then withdrew for financial reasons.

Squads

Final standing

Men

Women

References

 Results

External links
 RSSSF Men
 RSSSF Women

 
1994 Asian Games events
1994
Asia Games
Asian Games
1995 FIFA Women's World Cup qualification
1994 Asian Games